Admiral Sir George Ayscue (c. 1616 – 5 April 1672) was an English naval officer who served in the English Civil War and the Anglo-Dutch Wars who rose to the rank of Admiral of the White. He also served as Governor of Scilly Isles (1647) and Governor of Barbados (1650–1652).

Biography
Ayscue (sometimes, erroneously, Askew or Ayscough) came from an old Lincolnshire family, and was knighted by Charles I on 9 August 1641. In 1646 he received a naval command, In August 1647 he was appointed Governor of Scilly Isles a post he held until January 1647. 

In July 1648, during the Civil War, while serving as a captain in the navy of the English Parliament, he was recognized as restoring sailors' allegiances at sea and later in the year given command of two vessels and promoted to Rear Admiral. 

In 1649, he was appointed Admiral of the Irish Seas. In 1650 Ayscue was appointed Governor of Barbados and Commander of the squadron sent to the island. In 1651, he served with General at Sea Robert Blake in the capture of the Scilly Isles from Sir John Granville, 1st Earl of Bath. Later that year he captured Barbados from Lord Willoughby and the other English colonies in the Americas. 

In the First Anglo-Dutch War he was defeated by the Dutch Commodore Michiel de Ruyter at the Battle of Plymouth. Relieved of his command, he went into service in the Swedish Navy, returning after the Restoration of Charles II. In 1664 he was appointed Rear-Admiral of the Blue Squadron. In June 1665, he was appointed Vice-Admiral of the Blue. During the Second Anglo-Dutch War he commanded a squadron at the Battle of Lowestoft in 1665.

In February 1666, he was appointed Admiral of the Blue and at the start of the Four Days' Battle in June 1666 he was elevated to the rank of Admiral of the White, his flagship, ran aground on the Galloper Shoal and he was forced to surrender his ship to Lieutenant-Admiral Cornelis Tromp, earning the unfortunate distinction of being the highest-ranking English naval officer to have been captured by the enemy. He was held prisoner during the war in the Dutch state prison of Loevestein, and almost certainly never again took to sea as admiral. 

In December 1671, he was the President of the Court Martial of Rear-Admiral Sir William Jennings, held on board . Sir George Ayscue was still a serving officer when he died at his Westminster house on 5 April 1672. His burial was held on 13 April 1672 at St Margaret's Church, Westminster, London, England.

References

1671 deaths
Royal Navy admirals
Roundheads
Royal Navy personnel of the First Anglo-Dutch War
English prisoners of war
1610s births
Burials at St Margaret's, Westminster
Royal Navy personnel of the Second Anglo-Dutch War